Penn State Hazleton is a commonwealth campus of the Pennsylvania State University located in Sugarloaf Township, Pennsylvania.  It has an enrollment of 426 students as of 2021.

History
Penn State Hazleton's origins trace back to 1934 during the depths of the Great Depression.  Since this was a time when many people could not afford to go to college, the college came to the people. At the request of Hazleton's community leaders, a community survey was completed by the Pennsylvania State College's extension services to determine the actual extent of the need and community support for a center.  Hazleton was one of 14 communities to request a center, and only four requests were fulfilled.  In September 1934, the Hazleton Undergraduate Center opened with 47 full-time and 60 part-time evening students. The freshman and sophomore students began their studies in Hazleton and completed their degree at Penn State's University Park campus in State College or another institution.

Over the next several years, the center was housed in various locations—first in the upper floors of the Markle Bank Building on Broad and Wyoming Streets, then in the former Broad Street School. To accommodate the influx of men and women returning from service in World War II, additional space was leased in the A.D. Thomas Elementary School and the former Walnut Street School.

A permanent home came in December 1948 when the college purchased  in Sugarloaf Township which, for nearly 25 years, had served as the residential estate of local coal baron Eckley B. Markle. Known as “Highacres,” the site consisted of four buildings that gave the college the space it so desperately needed.  The estate, built by Alvan Markle Sr., featured a 32-room fieldstone mansion with every modern convenience available at the time, as well as domestic staff quarters, a greenhouse, and five formal gardens.  Markle's mansion quickly became the administration building and, at various times during its life, has housed offices, classrooms, the library, health services, a kitchen, and a dining room.  The domestic staff's quarters were transformed into the library, dormitory and infirmary. The greenhouse became the botany laboratory, and a new building, known today as Laurel Cottage, served as the chemistry laboratory.  Over the years, many new facilities were added to Penn State Hazleton.

Today, the administration building is the most recognized Penn State Hazleton structure, serving as one of the symbols of the campus. Recently, the island in the semi-circular driveway became the home to another Penn State icon - the Nittany Lion statue, a three-fourth's scale replica of the original at University Park.

Athletics
Penn State–Hazleton teams participate as a member of the United States Collegiate Athletic Association (USCAA). The Nittany Lions are a member of the Pennsylvania State University Athletic Conference (PSUAC). Men's sports include baseball, basketball, golf, soccer and tennis; while women's sports include basketball, golf, softball, tennis and volleyball.

Residence life
Residence Halls

Approximately 480 students live on the Hazleton campus.

 North Hall (156)
 South Hall (220)
 West Hall (100)

References

External links 

Official website

Pennsylvania State University colleges
Educational institutions established in 1934
Universities and colleges in Luzerne County, Pennsylvania
USCAA member institutions
1934 establishments in Pennsylvania
Hazleton